{{DISPLAYTITLE:C21H23NO2}}
The molecular formula C21H23NO2 may refer to:

 3-(4-Hydroxymethylbenzoyl)-1-pentylindole, a synthetic cannabinoid
 RCS-4, a synthetic cannabinoid originally sold as OBT-199

Molecular formulas